Pinball is a pinball simulation written by John Allen and published by Acorn Software Products in 1980 for the TRS-80.

Gameplay

Pinball is a game which gives variable speed of the ball as well as variable power of the ball release.

Reception
Jon Mishcon reviewed Pinball in The Space Gamer No. 36. Mishcon commented that "As a program, a strong endorsement, as a game, a qualified yes."

References

External links
Review in 80 Micro
Article in Creative Computing

1980 video games
Pinball video games
TRS-80 games
TRS-80-only games
Video games developed in the United States